Fritz Bock (26 February, 1911, Penzing  12 December, 1993) was an Austrian politician notable for having co-founded the Austrian People's Party in 1945 and having been Vice-Chancellor of Austria from 1966 to 1968.

Honours and awards
 Decoration for Services to the Republic of Austria:
1956: Great Gold Decoration with Star
1959: Great Gold Decoration with Ribbon

Notes and references 

1911 births
1993 deaths
Vice-Chancellors of Austria
Recipients of the Grand Decoration with Sash for Services to the Republic of Austria
People from Penzing (Vienna)